Thioglycolate broth is a multipurpose, enrichment, differential medium used primarily to determine the oxygen requirements of microorganisms. Sodium thioglycolate in the medium consumes oxygen and permits the growth of obligate anaerobes. This, combined with the diffusion of oxygen from the top of the broth, produces a range of oxygen concentrations in the medium along its depth. The oxygen concentration at a given level is indicated by a redox-sensitive dye such as resazurine that turns pink in the presence of oxygen.

This allows the differentiation of obligate aerobes, obligate anaerobes, facultative anaerobes, microaerophiles, and aerotolerant organisms.  For example, obligately anaerobic Clostridium species will be seen growing only in the bottom of the test tube.

Thioglycolate broth is also used to recruit macrophages to the peritoneal cavity of mice when injected intraperitoneally. It recruits numerous macrophages, but does not activate them.

References 

Microbiological media
Cell culture media